Mazen Abu Shararah (born 27 February 1991) is a Saudi Arabian football player who currently plays as a forward.

References

External links
 

Living people
1991 births
Association football forwards
Saudi Arabian footballers
Al-Nahda Club (Saudi Arabia) players
Al-Qadsiah FC players
Al-Raed FC players
Damac FC players
Al-Ahli Saudi FC players
Place of birth missing (living people)
Saudi First Division League players
Saudi Professional League players